The New Guinea Highlands, also known as the Central Range or Central Cordillera, is a long chain of mountain ranges on the island of New Guinea, including the island's tallest peak, Puncak Jaya, Indonesia, the highest mountain in Oceania. The range is home to many intermountain river valleys, many of which support thriving agricultural communities. The highlands run generally east-west the length of the island, which is divided politically between Indonesia in the west and Papua New Guinea in the east.

Geography
The Central Cordillera, some peaks of which are capped with ice, consists of (from east to west): the Central Highlands and Eastern Highlands of Papua New Guinea including the Owen Stanley Range in the southeast, whose highest peak is Mount Victoria at 4,038 metres (13,248 feet), the Albert Victor Mountains, the Sir Arthur Gordon Range, and the Bismarck Range, whose highest peak is Mount Wilhelm at 4,509 metres (14,793 feet), which is an extinct volcano with a crater lake; the Star Mountains on the Papua New Guinea–Indonesia border; and the Maoke Mountains or Snow Range in Indonesia, where perpetual snow was found by H. A. Lorentz in 1909 at 4,461 m (14,635 ft), and whose highest peaks are Puncak Jaya (Mt. Carstensz) at 4,884 m (16,024 feet), Puncak Mandala (Mt. Juliana) at 4,760 m (15,610 ft) and Puncak Trikora (Mt. Wilhelmina) at 4,750 m (15,580 ft).

Although some valleys such as the Waghi Valley in the Western Highlands, Papua New Guinea are heavily cultivated and support urban settlements most of the mountains have traditional tribal village communities in the grassy mountain valleys. The PNG highland provinces are: Eastern Highlands Province; Simbu Province (or Chimbu) whose centre is the small coffee-growing town of Kundiawa on the Wahgi River near Mount Wilhelm; Jiwaka Province; the Western Highlands; the rugged Enga Province the home of the Enga people with its administration in the very small town of Wabag on the Lai River, and containing the large Porgera Gold Mine; Hela Province; Southern Highlands Province, with its centre in the small town and airport of Mendi, and containing the Huli wigmen area around the town of Tari; and parts of West Sepik Province and Western Province. The Highlands Highway connects many of these towns. Larger urban areas in the PNG Highlands include the Western Highlands capital and PNG's 3rd largest city Mount Hagen (near the extinct Mount Hagen (volcano)), the Eastern Highlands capital and former colonial town of Goroka, and the mining town of Tabubil. The climate is humid as you would expect of the tropical rainforested island of New Guinea, but the higher mountain slopes are of course cooler than the lowlands.

The Highlands are the source of a number of important rivers including the Sepik River and Ramu River in the north and the Fly River in the south, and lakes including Lake Kutubu, near which oil has been extracted since 1992 by Chevron.  Mining is also very active in the region to the detriment of indigenous groups, with frequent friction.

Topography
List of highest peaks in New Guinea Highlands by elevation.

 Puncak Jaya 
 Sumantri 
 Ngga Pulu 
 Carstensz East 
 Carstensz Timur 
 Puncak Mandala 
 Puncak Trikora 
 Ngga Pilimsit 
 Middenspits 
 Mount Yamin 14,900 ft (4,541 m)
 Wachter 
 Gunung Speelman 
 Mount Wilhelm 
 JP Coen Peak 
 Valentijn Peak 
 Mount Giluwe 
 Mount Kubor 
 Mount Boising 
 Mount Bangeta 
 Mt. Kabangama 
 Mount Victoria 
 Mt. Albert Edward 
 Mount Capella 
 Mount Hagen 
 Mount Suckling 12,060 ft (3,676 m) 
 Mount Michael 
 Mount Arfak 
 Mount Bosavi

Rivers

List of River in New Guinea Highlands by length.

 Sepik River 
 Mamberamo River 
 Fly River 
 Digul River 
 Strickland River 
 Taritatu River 
 Purari River 
 Ramu River 
 Tariku River 
 Wawoi River 
 Kikori River 
 Baliem River 
 Pulau River 
 Turama River 
Apaoewar River 
 Wahgi River 
 Erave River 
 Ok Tedi River 
 Markham River 
 Kumusi River 
 Gami River 
Tor River 
Ka River 
 Aikwa River 
 Kaugel River

Geology
This chain of mountains continues to rise (with corresponding quakes) as the Australian Plate collides with the plates to the northeast, yet marking the southern boundaries of the Maoke and Woodlark plates. The width of the mountain range varies considerably, with a central thin segment near the borders of the two nations.

The surface geology of the highlands is made up of metamorphic and intrusive igneous rocks. The metamorphic rocks were Cretaceous and Eocene ocean sediments that were uplifted and folded between the Eocene and early Miocene periods. There are also Pleistocene stratovolcanoes in the highlands, including Mount Hagen and Mount Giluwe.

History

The fertile Highlands have long been inhabited and artifacts uncovered in the Ivane Valley indicate that the Highlands were first settled about 50,000 years ago. The inhabitants were nomadic foragers but around 10,000 years ago began developing a fairly advanced agricultural society. The Highlands were not settled by the Western powers during the early colonial period and they were first visited by western zoologists and explorers, such as Mick Leahy, who opened the Wahgi Valley and Mount Hagen, and Richard Archbold in the 1930s. During World War II, the eastern highlands saw the Kokoda Track campaign in which Australian and New Zealand soldiers, along with native guides who were pressed into service, fought and ultimately stopped the Japanese from advancing south towards Port Moresby and, ultimately, northern Queensland on the Australian mainland.

The culture of inter-tribal warfare and animosity between the neighboring tribes have long been present in the Highlands.

Ecology
The New Guinea Highlands are home to a great variety of Australasian plant and animal communities, distinct from the surrounding lowlands to the north and south of the central ranges and varying up and along the mountain ranges. The habitats of the mountains have been separated into two ecoregions, depending on their elevation, the tropical montane forests and alpine grasslands, but within these broad bands there is a variety of wildlife along the island as some of the mountains stand quite a distance from others with some species of plant or animal existing on only one or two mountains. Particular centres of plant diversity are: the Star Mountains area of western Papua New Guinea near the Indonesian border including Telefomin and Strickland Gorge; the Hunstein Range; Mount Giluwe, a major birdwatching area for birds-of-paradise; the volcanic limestone Kubor Range; the Bismarck Range/Mount Wilhelm/Schrader Range/Mount Gahavisuka, of which Mount Wilhelm is particularly rich in endemic species; and finally the Crater Mountain and Mount Michael in the Eastern Highlands.

Central Range montane rain forests

The montane rain forests (from 1,000 to 3,000m) can be further categorised into three broad vegetation zones on the mountains, distinguished by elevation. The lower montane forests extend from 1,000 to 1,500 metres elevation. They are dominated by broadleaf evergreen trees, including Castanopsis acuminatissima, Lithocarpus spp., elaeocarps, and laurels. Coniferous Araucarias may form thick stands. The upper montane forests, which extend from 1,500 to 2,500 metres elevation, are dominated by moss-covered Nothofagus. Finally, the high mountain forest extends from 2,500 to 3,000 metres elevation. Conifers (Podocarpus, Dacrycarpus, Dacrydium, Papuacedrus, Araucaria, and Libocedrus) and broadleaf trees of the myrtle family (Myrtaceae) form a thin canopy, with a prominent understory.

The montane forests are home to a rich wildlife, a great deal of which is unique to these mountains including many plants, reptiles and over 100 birds and animals. Of the 90 mammals found on the island, 44 are endemic, a very high proportion. The birds and animals include many Australasian species such as tree-kangaroos, bowerbirds, Australasian robins, honeyeaters, and birds-of-paradise. Four of the endemic mammals are critically endangered: the Bulmer's fruit bat, with only tiny communities remaining in the Papua New Guinea end of the island, and three rodents; a large Leptomys, the eastern shrew mouse, and the lesser small-toothed rat. There are 55 bird species endemic to the mountains from a total of 348 birds found here. There are a number of endemic butterflies, particularly on the Weyland Mountains and the Wahgi Valley.

Apart from in the cultivated valleys the montane forests are largely intact, although the logging industry is a constant threat as more and more access to the mountains is achieved by road building. 20% of this ecoregion is contained within protected areas, mostly in the Indonesian half of the island, including the largest protected area in South East Asia, the huge Lorentz National Park in the highlands, a section of which is montane forest ecosystem.

Central Range sub-alpine grasslands

Above 3,000 metres elevation, the high mountain forest yields to remote sub-alpine habitats including alpine meadows, conifer forest, tree-fern (Cyathea) grasslands, bogs, and shrubby heaths of Rhododendron, Vaccinium, Coprosma, Rapanea, and Saurauia all quite different from the tropical rain forest that covers most of New Guinea.

The alpine habitat above 4,000 metres consists of compact rosette and cushion herbs, such as Ranunculus, Potentilla, Gentiana, and Epilobium, grasses (Poa and Deschampsia), bryophytes, and lichens.

While there are a number of endemic plants there are few animals on the higher slopes, with only nine mammals found here: four rodents, two bats, a cuscus possum, an antechinus and Doria's tree-kangaroo (Dendrolagus dorianus). Four of these are endemic: the small marsupial black-tailed antechinus (Murexechinus melanurus), western shrew mouse, glacier rat and alpine woolly rat. There are nearly 100 birds of which 28 are considered endemic or nearly so, including the vulnerable long-bearded honeyeater (Melionyx princeps), ribbon-tailed astrapia (Astrapia mayeri) and Macgregor's giant honeyeater, which although endangered generally is a cultural icon of the Ketengban people of the Star Mountains and therefore protected in some areas.

Almost half of these remote grasslands are protected in national parks and they are in good condition although in recent times more people are accessing the highlands as visitors or through involvement in mining.

Natural Parks

List of Natural Parks in New Guinea Highlands.

Lorentz National Park
Mount Wilhelm National Park

See also

 List of highest mountains of New Guinea
 Highlands Highway

References

External links
 
 

Australasian ecoregions
Ecoregions of Indonesia
Ecoregions of New Guinea
Ecoregions of Papua New Guinea

Geography of New Guinea
Highlands
Natural history of New Guinea
Natural history of Papua New Guinea
Natural history of Western New Guinea
Natural regions
Montane forests
Montane grasslands and shrublands
Mountain ranges of Western New Guinea
Mountain ranges of Papua New Guinea
Mountains of Western New Guinea
Tropical and subtropical moist broadleaf forests